In My Room is a 2018 German drama film directed by . It was screened in the Un Certain Regard section at the 2018 Cannes Film Festival.

Plot
Hans Löw plays Armin, a cameraman whose professional and personal lives are dysfunctional. He suddenly finds himself apparently the only survivor of some unspecified calamity that causes every other human being to disappear. After wandering for months or years and making do with what humanity has left behind, he encounters Kirsi (Elena Radonicich) and the two form a romantic relationship but Armin reproduces all the same pettiness that he had before humanity's disappearance.

Cast
 Hans Löw as Armin
 Elena Radonicich as Kirsi
 Michael Wittenborn as Father

Reception
Writing for The A.V. Club, Mike D'Angelo gave the film an A−, saying of the character study, "this droll yet poignant amalgam of the fantastic and the mundane ultimately suggests that while people can dramatically alter their behavior in response to extreme circumstances, on some fundamental level they don’t really change".

See also
 Bokeh

References

External links
 
Page from Pandora Film
 
 Cineuropa

2018 films
2018 drama films
German drama films
2010s German-language films
2010s German films